La gloria y el infierno (English title:The glory and hell) is a Mexican telenovela produced by Gonzalo Martínez Ortega and Juan Osorio for Televisa in 1986. It is based on the novela Duelo al so by the American writer Niven Busch. It starred Ofelia Medina, Héctor Bonilla, Fernando Balzaretti and Saby Kamalich.

Plot
After the Mexican Revolution, Sara Vallarta, wife of Fernando de Michoacán a landowner agrees to meet with his cousin and former boyfriend, Sebastian Arteaga. To avoid rumors, Concerta appointment in an abandoned church and go along with his two sons, Michael and Sergio. Sebastian confesses he has joined an Indian with whom he has a daughter, Agnes, but that has never stopped loving her.

He asks Sara that if something happens to him, care for your family. Just Sebastián goes, appears Fernando who explained while Sara immediately assumes she is unfaithful and since then, ejected from his bed and does not return you to talk to. Although Sara is still living in the home of her ex-husband, is practically a ghost because it is completely ignored.

Sebastian dies, and his wife, Sara proud not go where, however, relates to the owner of a tavern not caring that Inés grow in such sordid environment. Twenty years later, President Lázaro Cárdenas began his agrarian program of expropriation of farms, and Fernando Vallarta is the main opposition to this measure. Just in these circumstances is when the beautiful orphan Inés comes to live with Vallarta.

Cast 
 
 Ofelia Medina as Inés Arteaga
 Héctor Bonilla as Miguel Vallarta
 Fernando Balzaretti as Sergio Vallarta
 Jorge Russek as Don Fernando Vallarta
 Saby Kamalich as Sara Vallarta
 Elvira Monsell as Martina
 Pedro Armendáriz Jr. as Sebastián Arteaga
 Salvador Sánchez as Asunción
 Anna Silvetti as Adriana
 Lucía Guilmáin as Concha
 Josefina Echánove as Guadalupe
 Arturo Beristáin as Madrigal
 Dolores Beristáin as Vicenta
 Arturo Benavides as Pontón
 Arlette Pacheco as Amalia
 Patricio Castillo as Dr. Mendoza
 Carlos Cardán as Valerio Redondo
 Miguel Gómez Checa as Augusto
 Alberto Gavira as Graciano
 Uriel Chávez as Cruz
 Guillermo Gil as Genaro
 Gilberto Pérez Gallardo as Yáñez
 David Phillips as Sergio (child)
 Sergio Bonilla as Miguel (child)
 Nelly as Inés (child)
 Mario Casillas as Lic. Arvides
 Blanca Torres as María
 Quintín Bulnes as Yáñez
 Narciso Busquets as Gallardo
 Jorge Fegán
 Maribel Tarrago
 Jesús Gómez Munguía
 Ángel de la Peña
 Gustavo del Castillo
 Federico Romano
 Dacia González

Awards

References

External links

1986 telenovelas
Mexican telenovelas
1986 Mexican television series debuts
1986 Mexican television series endings
Spanish-language telenovelas
Television shows set in Mexico
Televisa telenovelas